Aelius Moeris (probably flourished in the 2nd century A.D.) was a Greek grammarian, surnamed Atticista (the Atticist).

Works
He was the author of an extant (more or less alphabetical) list of Attic forms and expressions, accompanied by the Hellenistic parallels of his own time, the differences of gender, accent, and meaning being clearly and succinctly pointed out.

Editions
 John Hudson (1711)
 J. Pierson (1759)
 A. Koch (1830)
 Harpocration et Moeris I. Bekker (ed.), 1833

References

2nd-century Greek people
2nd-century writers
Ancient Greek grammarians
Atticists (grammarians)
Year of birth unknown
Year of death unknown